Consumer Priority Service Corporation is an international provider of repair and extended warranty services for the consumer electronics and appliance industries. Its corporate headquarters are located in Kings County, New York with regional offices in Newark, New Jersey, Florida. Consumer Priority Service Corporation's additional divisions are technical support, national call centers and marketing departments.

History
Established in 1990, in Newark, New Jersey Consumer Priority Service Corporation originally started as a regional repair center servicing the NY tri-state area. It evolved into a warranty provider by subcontracting repair work to servicers outside of the company's coverage area.

In 2010 the company was featured at the International Consumer Electronics Show (CES) in Las Vegas as part of an industry awareness collective that raised points about consumer electronics and the average lifetime failure rate of many of today's more prominent gadgets.

Awards

|-
| 2014
| Best Use of Technology in Customer Service
| Stevie Awards
| 
|}

References

Business services companies established in 1990
1990 establishments in New Jersey